Rask County is in Sistan and Baluchestan province, Iran. The capital of the county is the city of Rask. At the 2006 census, the county's population (as the Central, Parud, and Pishin Districts of Sarbaz County) was 70,320 in 13,302 households. The following census in 2011 counted 91,556 people in 19,997 households. At the 2016 census, the population was 94,887 in 23,272 households. These divisions separated from Sarbaz County in December of 2018 to form Rask County.

Administrative divisions

The population history and structural changes of Rask County's administrative divisions (as parts of Sarbaz County) over three consecutive censuses are shown in the following table.

References

Counties of Sistan and Baluchestan Province

fa:شهرستان راسک (ایران)